Jean-Charles Frontier was born in Paris in 1701. He was a pupil of Claude-Guy Hallé, and took the first prize at the Academy in 1728, with a picture of Ezekiel abolishing Idolatry and establishing the Worship of the true God. He was received as an academician in 1744, with the picture Prometheus bound on Caucasus, now in the Louvre. He exhibited at the Salon from 1743 to 1761, and became director of the Academy of Lyon, where he died in 1763.

References
 

1701 births
1763 deaths
18th-century French painters
French male painters
Painters from Paris
Prix de Rome for painting
Members of the Académie des beaux-arts
18th-century French male artists